Sarah Stouffer is an American actress best known for her lead role in the independent coming-of-age 2010 film Bloomington, in which she played the undergraduate Jackie Kirk who becomes romantically involved with psychology professor Catherine Stark (Allison McAtee).

Early life
Stouffer is originally from Vacaville, California, where she performed in musical theatre growing up. She moved to Los Angeles at the age of 19, working in a fondue restaurant until her acting career took off.

Education 
Stouffer was home schooled. She studied and performed with the Solano Youth Theatre.

Career
With largely theatre work under her belt, and no film experience, Stouffer was cast in the lead role of Jackie Kirk in the 2010 film Bloomington, written and directed by Fernanda Cardoso. She later joked that being booked for the role was "beginner's luck". Producer Jason Shumway admitted that he initially had doubts about her playing the role as she looked so young to be dating a lecturer. "It does make it a little more controversial, I think," he added. Bloomington toured the lesbian and gay film festival circuit and Stouffer won the Outstanding Emerging Talent Award in the 2011 FilmOut Programming Awards.
 
Guest roles on established television series, including Bones and Criminal Minds, followed. She also landed more film roles, including the comedy-horror Chastity Bites  and the television movie A Cinderella Christmas. In 2015, she played a recurring role, as Tess Ritter, in the ABC series Switched at Birth. Four years later, she had a lead role in the 2019 short Suicide Date, directed by Doug Hurley, which won Audience Award Overall Fest and Audience Award Fusion Shorts at Dances With Films in Los Angeles.

Stouffer is a co-writer and producer of Grey Area and plays the part of Kate. In June 2021 she was reunited with Bloomington co-star Allison McAtee who guest starred in two episodes of Grey Area. The pair’s shared scenes made tongue-in-cheek references to Bloomington.

In 2021 she wrote, directed and starred in the short What About Us?.

Stouffer also works with video production company Who Shoots Your Films? as a producer and director.

Personal life
Stouffer lives in Los Angeles with the rapper, actor, writer and director, Asaad Salleh, also known as Emerson Kennedy.

Filmography

Films

Television

Other work

References

External links
 
 
 

People from Vacaville, California
Actresses from California
Living people
1986 births